Timo Maran (born 13 April 1975) is an Estonian biosemiotician and poet.

He is the head Department of Semiotics, University of Tartu.

Membership in organizations:
 Estonian Naturalists' Society (vice-president 2007–2010)
 Estonian Semiotics Association (vice-chairman 2006–2008, 2010–2012)
 Estonian Literary Society
 Estonian Writers' Union
 European Association for the Study of Literature, Culture and Environment (member of advisory board since 2010)
 International Society for Biosemiotic Studies (member of the executive board 2010–2012, vice-president since 2012)
 Nordic Association for Semiotic Studies (member of the board 2011-...)

Works
 2001 poetry collection "Põhjavesi" (Erakkond)
 2007 poetry collection "Metsa pööramine" (Erakkond)
 2007 poetry collection "Poeetiline punane raamat / Poetics of Endangered Species" (Ukraina Kultuurikeskus, Ajakirjade Kirjastus)
 2015 poetry collection "Las ma ümisen" (Allikaäärne)
 2015 children stories "Kodukakk, päevakoer ja teised" (Päike ja Pilv)
 2017 monograph "Mimicry and Meaning: Structure and Semiotics of Biological Mimicry" (Springer)
 2019 poetry collection "Metsloomatruudus" (Elusamus)
 2020 monograph "Ecosemiotics. The Study of Signs in Changing Ecologies" (Cambridge University Press)

References

Living people
1975 births
Estonian semioticians
Estonian male poets
21st-century Estonian poets
University of Tartu alumni
Academic staff of the University of Tartu